The 2012 FIM Fogo Croatian Speedway Grand Prix was the seventh race of the 2012 Speedway Grand Prix season. It took place on July 28 at the Stadium Milenium in Donji Kraljevec, Croatia.

The Grand Prix was won by Nicki Pedersen who beat Andreas Jonsson, Tomasz Gollob and wild card Jurica Pavlic.

Riders 
The Speedway Grand Prix Commission nominated Bartosz Zmarzlik as Wild Card, and Piotr and Przemysław Pawlicki both as Track Reserves. Injured Jarosław Hampel was replaced by first Qualified Substitutes, Martin Vaculík. The draw was made on July 27.
 (3)  Jarosław Hampel → (19)  Martin Vaculík

Heat details

Heat after heat 
 (59,50) Hancock, Lindgren, Sayfutdinov, Lindbäck
 (60,17) Crump, B.Pedersen, Pavlic, Harris
 (60,01) Jonsson, Andersen, Holder, Ljung
 (60,23) N.Pedersen, Bjerre, Gollob, Vaculík
 (60,70) Vaculík, Hancock, Andersen, B.Pedersen
 (60,14) Harris, N.Pedersen, Lindgren, Ljung
 (60,03) Holder, Bjerre, Crump, Lindbäck
 (61,04) Jonsson, Pavlic, Sayfutdinov, Gollob
 (61,14) Harris, Holder, Gollob, Hancock
 (61,32) Jonsson, Lindgren, Bjerre, B.Pedersen
 (61,20) Pavlic, N.Pedersen, Lindbäck, Andersen
 (61,21) Crump, Vaculík, Sayfutdinov, Ljung
 (61,36) N.Pedersen, Crump, Hancock, Jonsson
 (61,53) Lindgren, Pavlic, Vaculík, Holder (Fx)
 (61,75) Gollob, Lindbäck, B.Pedersen, Ljung
 (61,64) Andersen, Harris, Sayfutdinov, Bjerre
 (61,85) Hancock, Bjerre, Pavlic, Ljung
 (62,34) Gollob, Andersen, Lindgren, Crump
 (61,68) Lindbäck, Vaculík, Harris, Jonsson
 (61,73) Sayfutdinov, B.Pedersen, N.Pedersen, Kovacic
 Semifinals
 (61,86) Pavlic, N.Pedersen, Harris, Lindgren (X)
 (61,98) Gollob, Jonsson, Hancock, Crump
 the Final
 (62,18) N.Pedersen, Jonsson, Gollob, Pavlic

The intermediate classification

References

See also 
 motorcycle speedway

Croatia
2012
Speedway Grand Prix